Menegazzia anteforata is a species of foliose lichen from Taiwan. It was described as new to science in 2003.

See also
List of Menegazzia species

References

anteforta
Lichen species
Lichens described in 2003
Lichens of Asia
Taxa named by André Aptroot